Luton Town Football Club is an English football club based since 1905 at Kenilworth Road, Luton, Bedfordshire. The side currently plays in the Championship, the second tier of football in England. Founded in 1885, Luton Town became the first professional team in southern England six years later and joined The Football League in 1897. After leaving the League in 1900 due to financial strife, Luton Town competed in the Southern League until Football League membership was regained 20 years later. After an 89-year period of League membership, the team was relegated to the Conference Premier in 2009 due to a 30-point deduction imposed by the football authorities. Five seasons later, the club won promotion back to The Football League.

Luton Town's first team has competed in numerous nationally contested competitions, and the 50 players judged in 2009 the club's best by Denis O'Donoghue of The Times are listed below. In addition, all players who have appeared 100 times for the club in these competitions are given. Club record holders are also included, regardless of the number of matches they played.

Fred Hawkes holds the record for most league appearances for the club, having played 509 matches between 1901 and 1920. The closest to Hawkes's record is Bob Morton, who appeared 495 times between 1948 and 1964. Including all senior competitions, Morton leads the chart with 562 compared to Hawkes's 549. As of 1 July 2009, the player who has won the most international caps while at the club is Mal Donaghy, who appeared 58 times for Northern Ireland.

The goalscoring record is held by Gordon Turner, who scored 276 goals between 1949 and 1964. Turner's tally of 243 league goals is also a club record. Turner's nearest rival is Andy Rennie, whose 147 league goals, 162 in total, were scored between 1925 and 1934. Joe Payne holds the Luton Town record for the most goals scored in a season, set in 1936–37, with 55 league goals in 39 Third Division South games and 58 in all competitions. Payne also holds the Football League record for most goals in a match, with 10 during a 12–0 victory over Bristol Rovers on 13 April 1936. Turner holds the club record for most goals in a top-flight season, with 33 league goals and 38 overall during 1957–58.

Key
Players with name in bold currently play for the club.
Players with this background and text in bold in the "Nationality" column won full international caps for their country while with the club. If no reliable source has yet been found for the exact number of such caps won, the caps column will be empty and a reference will be supplied for the player having been capped during the relevant period.
 ¤ Players with this background and symbol in the "Notes" column are club record holders, and have footnotes detailing their achievements.
 † Players with this background and symbol in the "Club career" column played for Luton for their entire football career.
Years are the first and last calendar years in which the player appeared in competitive first-team football for the club.
League appearances and goals comprise those in the Southern Football League, the United League, the Football League and the Conference Premier.
Total appearances and goals comprise those in the Southern Football League, United League, Football League (including play-offs), Conference Premier, FA Cup, Football League Cup, Associate Members' Cup/Football League Trophy and several now-defunct competitions including the Anglo-Italian Cup, Texaco Cup, Watney Cup and Full Members' Cup.

Notable players
Appearances and goals are for first-team competitive matches only; wartime matches are excluded. Substitute appearances are included. Statistics are correct up to and including the match played on 5 February 2022.

The Times top 50 (2009)
Following Luton Town's relegation from The Football League in April 2009, a list of the 50 best Luton Town players of all-time was compiled by The Times journalist Denis O'Donoghue. The players selected by O'Donoghue are given below.

Other Luton Town centurions and record holders
Players other than those selected by O'Donoghue who either made 100 first-team appearances for Luton Town or hold a club record appear here.

Notes

a  Number of international caps won while at the club sourced to Hayes, Completely Top Hatters! except where otherwise noted.
b  For a full description of positions see Football Positions.
c  Southern Football League and United League appearances and goals sourced to Collings, The Luton Town Story 1885–1985.Football League appearances and goals for players whose career ended up to and including 1997 sourced to Bailey, The Definitive Luton Town F.C.. This list excludes games played in the abandoned 1939–40 season.League appearances and goals for players whose career ended post-1997 sourced to Soccerbase.
d  Other appearances and goals sourced to Bailey, The Definitive Luton Town F.C. unless the player's career ended post-1997, in which case they are sourced to Soccerbase.

Footnotes

A.  Joe Payne holds the club record for most league goals in a season (55 in 1936–37). He also holds the Football League record for most goals in a match – 10 against Bristol Rovers on 13 April 1936.
B.  Bob Morton holds the records for most Luton Town appearances in both the Football League (495) and in all competitions (562).
C.  Gordon Turner holds the records for most Luton Town goals scored in both the league (243) and in all competitions (276).
D.  Tony Read was unusually utilised as both a goalkeeper and as a forward – he is listed here as a goalkeeper as he appeared more often in that position.
E.  Mal Donaghy holds the club record for most international appearances while with the club, with 58 of his 91 for Northern Ireland coming while he was at Kenilworth Road.
F.  With five England caps, Paul Walsh shares the record for most England appearances by a Luton Town player with Bob Hawkes.
G.  Curtis Davies became Luton Town's most expensive sale when he was sold to West Bromwich Albion for £3,000,000 on 31 August 2006.
H.  Fred Hawkes holds the records for most league appearances for Luton Town, with 509.
I.  Bob Hawkes became the first Luton Town player to be capped by any country when he appeared for England against Ireland on 16 February 1907.
J.  While a Luton Town player, the dual Irish international Tom Aherne made one appearance for the Irish Football Association-controlled all-Ireland team and 13 for the Football Association of Ireland-affiliated Ireland team.   
K.  Lars Elstrup became Luton Town's most expensive signing ever when the club paid £850,000 to buy him from Odense Boldklub on 17 August 1989.

References
Bibliography

Notes

Players
 
Luton Town F.C. players
Association football player non-biographical articles